Lardiés is a hamlet located in the municipality of Fiscal, Aragon, in Huesca province, Aragon, Spain. As of 2020, it has a population of 10.

Geography 
Lardiés is located 69km north-northeast of Huesca.

References

Populated places in the Province of Huesca